Kuhmoinen is a municipality of Finland, in Pirkanmaa region, but until 2021, it was part of the Central Finland region. The municipality is home to  inhabitants.

Neighbour municipalities are Jämsä, Kangasala, Luhanka, Orivesi, Padasjoki and Sysmä. The municipality is unilingually Finnish.

Nature
There are all together even 316 lakes in Kuhmoinen. Kuhmoinen lies on the west coast of Lake Päijänne. Biggest lakes in Kuhmoinen after Päijänne are Vehkajärvi and Isojärvi.

Isojärvi National Park resides in Kuhmoinen on the south side of Lake Isojärvi.

History 
Kuhmoinen was established in the medieval times. It was first mentioned in 1483 as Kuchmois. At the time, it was a part of the Padasjoki parish and a center of a fourth (neljänneskunta) within the parish.

Twinnings
 Puhja Parish, Estonia

People born in Kuhmoinen
Robert Ruohtula (1853 – 1914)
Joel Naaralainen (1867 – 1915)

Gallery

References

External links

Municipality of Kuhmoinen – Official website 
Isojärvi National Park